Tomislav Marić (born 29 October 1997), better known by his stage name ToMa, is a Croatian singer signed to Dallas Records. He began his career after participating in season three of The Voice Hrvatska. He rose to fame in 2021 after participating at Dora 2021 where he finished sixth.

Music career
Marić notably performed at the Koševo City Stadium during Pope Francis' 2015 visit to Sarajevo.

In early 2017, Marić released his first single "Nije grijeh", a collaboration with Kristina Boban. Marić signed a record deal with Hit Records and released two singles under them, "Ljubiš, ali ne voliš" i "Noć za kraj". In 2020 he parted ways with Hit Records and signed a new deal with Dallas Records. 

In December 2020, Marić was announced as one of the 14 finalists for Dora 2021, the national contest in Croatia to select the country's Eurovision Song Contest 2021 entry. He ranked sixth after performing the song "Ocean of Love" which was written by Adriana Pupavac, Andreas Björkman, Kalle Persson and Marić. "Ocean of Love" later baceme Marić's first song to chart on the HR Top 40 chart. A year later, on 17 December 2021, Marić was announced as one of the acts to perform at Dora 2022 with the song "In the Darkness".

Discography

Singles

References

1997 births
21st-century Croatian male singers
Living people
Croatian pop singers
Croatian pop musicians
The Voice (franchise) contestants
People from Livno
Croats of Bosnia and Herzegovina